The Second Battle of Pocotaligo, or Battle of Pocotaligo Bridge, or Battle of Yemassee, often referred to as simply the Battle of Pocotaligo, was a battle in the American Civil War on October 22, 1862 near Yemassee, South Carolina. The Union objective was to sever the Charleston and Savannah Railroad and thus isolate Charleston, South Carolina.

Order of battle

Confederate
Commanding: Colonel William Stephen Walker

Initial force:
 Company E, 11th South Carolina Infantry - Cpt. John H. Mickler
 1st South Carolina Sharpshooters (Companies B, C, D) - Cpt. Joseph B. Allston
 1st South Carolina Cavalry Battalion
 Rutledge Mounted Rifles
 Kirk's Partisan Rangers - Cpt. Manning J. Kirk
 Charleston Light Dragoons
 Beaufort Volunteer Artillery - Cpt. Stephen Elliott, Jr.
 Hanover Artillery - Cpt. George W. Nelson
 LaFayette Artillery - Lt. L. F. LeBleux

Reinforcements from Charleston
 7th South Carolina Infantry Battalion - Lt. Col. Patrick H. Nelson
 11th South Carolina Infantry (Companies C, D, K) - Maj. John J. Harrison (k)
 14th South Carolina Cavalry Battalion - Maj. Joseph H. Morgan

Reinforcements from Grahamville
 3rd South Carolina Cavalry - Lt. Col. Thomas H. Johnson
 1st South Carolina Sharpshooters (Two Companies)

Union
Commanding: Brig. Gen. John M. Brannan

1st Brigade: Col. John Lyman Chatfield (w)
 6th Connecticut Volunteer Infantry
 3rd New Hampshire Volunteer Infantry
 4th New Hampshire Volunteer Infantry
 48th New York Volunteer Infantry - Col. William B. Barton
 76th Pennsylvania Volunteer Infantry - Col. Dewitt Strawbridge

2nd Brigade: Brig. Gen. Alfred Terry
 3rd Rhode Island Volunteer Infantry
 47th Pennsylvania Volunteer Infantry - Col. Tilghman H. Good
 55th Pennsylvania Volunteer Infantry
 7th Connecticut Volunteer Infantry

Engineers
 1st New York Engineers (Two Companies) - Col. Edward W. Serrell

Cavalry
 1st Massachusetts Volunteer Cavalry

Artillery
 Battery B, 1st US Artillery
 Batteries C,E,K,L,M 3rd Rhode Island Heavy Artillery

Battle
On October 21, 1862, a  4200-man Union force, under the command of Brigadier General John M. Brannan, embarked on troop transport ships and left from Hilton Head, South Carolina. Brannan's orders were "to destroy the railroad and railroad bridges on the Charleston and Savannah line." Under protection of a Naval Squadron, they steamed up the Broad River, and disembarked the next morning at Mackey Point (between the Pocotaligo and Coosawhatchie Rivers), less than ten miles from the railroad. The 47th and 55th Pennsylvania Infantry Regiments, under  Colonel Tilghman H. Good's command, began the march toward Pocotaligo.  A smaller detachment of 300 men – two companies of engineers and the 48th New York regiment was ordered up the Coosawhatchie River to destroy the bridge at Coosawhatchie and then tear up the rails as they advanced on Pocotaligo.

Colonel William S. Walker, the Confederate commander responsible for defending the railroad, called for reinforcement from Savannah and Charleston. He deployed his available forces to counter the two Union advances, sending 200 of his men to guard the bridges, and dispatching the Beaufort Volunteer Artillery (CS), along with two companies of cavalry and some sharpshooters in support, to meet the main Union advance on the Mackey Point road. The Confederates encountered Brannan's Division near the abandoned Caston's Plantation and the artillery opened fire with their two howitzers. The Confederates retreated when the Union artillery responded.

With Brannan in pursuit, Walker's men slowly withdrew, falling back to their defensive fieldworks at Pocotaligo. The Union troops encountered the Confederates on the opposite side of a muddy marsh, and their advance stalled. Brigadier General Alfred Terry, in command of the Second Brigade, ordered the nearly 100 Sharps rifleman of the 7th Connecticut Infantry forward to the edge of the woods where the Union forces had taken cover. The rapid fire of the repeating rifles quickly suppressed the fire from the Confederate battery and associated infantry across the marsh, and they were soon ordered to cease firing to preserve ammunition. The opposing forces blazed away with cannon and musket fire at intervals for more than two hours, until Confederate reinforcements arrived. By then it was late in the day, and the Union troops were running low on ammunition.

Aftermath
As dusk descended, Brannan realized that the railroad bridge could not be reached, and ordered a retreat up the Mackay's Point road to the safety of the flotilla. The Confederate Rutledge Mounted Rifles and Kirk's Partisan Rangers pursued, but the 47th Pennsylvania Infantry Regiment Union rearguard held them off.  Brannan's troops reembarked at Mackay's Point the next morning and returned to Hilton Head.

References

Battles of the Eastern Theater of the American Civil War
1862 in the American Civil War
Battles of the American Civil War in South Carolina
1862 in South Carolina
Battles of the Lower Seaboard Theater and Gulf Approach of the American Civil War
Confederate victories of the American Civil War
Jasper County, South Carolina
History of Charleston, South Carolina
October 1862 events
19th-century in Charleston, South Carolina